Kishor Nepal (born 6 June 1952) is a Nepalese journalist and writer. He worked for and groomed Kantipur and Nagarik Nepalese publications.

Biography
Nepal was born on 6 June 1952 in Nuwakot district. His father worked in India. When Nepal was five years old, his father died, and his mother started working. Nepal went to Pashupati School in Chabahil, Nepal, and then got government scholarship to study in Durbar High School in Kathmandu. He completed higher education in Tri-Chandra College in Kathmandu.

After the college, Nepal started working as a supervisor in Department of Road in Bhairahawa for about five months, and then as a journalist from for local newspaper named Nabin Khabar. Later he joined Nepal Times under supervision of Chandra Lal Jha. Later, he worked as press advisor when Krishna Prasad Bhattarai was elected as a prime minister.

Career and contributions
He worked as the president of Federation of Nepali Journalists.

Books
 Mero Samaya (my time)
  Sutra Ra Prayog (Theories, Sources and Practices) in 2016.
 Nepali patrakarita ko bikaskram (2055 BS) (Development of Nepali journalism)
 Rang Mandal (Short novel, 2035 BS)
 Arko Prastar (Short stories, 2034 BS)
  Chintaka Chyanharu (Essays, 1982)
 Shaktiko awataran (Essays, 2062)
 Patal (Novel, 2068 BS)
 Shaharka Kathaharu (Novel, 2068 BS) (Stories of city)

Awards
 Kriti Smriti Journalism Britti Samman in 2019 from Ram Baran Yadav, the former president of Nepal.

Controversies
Nepal was beaten by attackers in december 2012 for publishing some photos which were taken as offensive by the supporter of monarch.

References

External links

1952 births
Living people
20th-century Nepalese male writers
Nepalese journalists
People from Nuwakot District
Nepalese writers
Durbar High School alumni
Tri-Chandra College alumni